Ⱪona Yeziⱪ may refer to:

Arabic-derived scripts for central-Asian languages:
 Chagatai script, variant of Arabic script used for Chagatai, and formerly Uyghur, languages
 Uyghur Ereb Yéziqi, specialized for Uyghur language